Caylloma District is one of twenty districts of the province Caylloma in Peru.

Geography 
Some of the highest mountains of the district are listed below:

Ethnic groups 
The people in the district are mainly indigenous citizens of Quechua descent. Quechua is the language which the majority of the population (62.79%) learnt to speak in childhood, 36.39% of the residents started speaking using the Spanish language (2007 Peru Census).

References

Districts of the Caylloma Province
Districts of the Arequipa Region